Dennis Blair (born February 21, 1955) is an American stand-up comedian.

Career
He is known for writing and appearing in the 1983 movie Easy Money, alongside his mentor, Rodney Dangerfield. He wrote for Dangerfield for four years including sketches for his network specials and jokes for his act. He provided the voice of Lem and Clem in the animated film Rover Dangerfield. 

He also wrote a Broadway show for Jackie Mason.

In 1998 he and Dug McGuirck produced "I Sleep Naked in the Rain", an album of songs from a then unproduced one man show with music.

Blair has served as the opening act for about 150 celebrity headliners, including comedians Rodney Dangerfield, Joan Rivers, Jackie Mason, and Alan King. He toured for 20 years with George Carlin. His days as an opening act to the stars prompted him to write a book about those experiences, titled Me First.

Blair has appeared on over 50 television shows, including The Tonight Show.

He was a co-writer of the program for the 2005 and the 2006 Writers Guild Awards.

Blair won the Charlie Award for best comedian in New York, and an Emmy Award for Confessions of a Standup

He is also a songwriter, having contributed the song "Ordinary Man" to the Easy Money soundtrack. 
Dennis and his songwriting partner John Durkin won the top-40 prize in "The American Song Festival." The duo won first place in the country music category of the Indie Music Channel's Radio Music Award for their song, "She Stayed".

Blair produced the album Rappin Rodney, which was nominated for a Grammy. He also co-wrote the album's title song.

Personal life
Blair lives in Las Vegas, playing music and performing comedy in clubs, casinos, theatres and cruise ships. His latest country songs are on iTunes and are played in many countries around the world.

References

External links
Official website

Dennis Blair at Rooftop Comedy
Bio

Living people
1955 births
American stand-up comedians